Poornima Krishnappa Yadav is an Indian politician from Karnataka state. She was elected as a member of Karnataka Legislative Assembly from Hiriyur constituency as member of Bharatiya Janata Party in 2018. She is the National President of All-India Yadav Mahasabha Women cell.

Family and education 
K Poornima was born to Smt. Manjula and A Krishnappa. She completed her Pre-University in and did her MA  in Bangalore University.

Political career
Poornima participated in MLA election from Varthur Assembly Constituency, Karnataka in May 2008. Poornima won in BBMP Elections held in 2010 from Basavanapura  from Indian National Congress party.  She was the ex-member for Tax & Finance Committee from 2010 to 2015 and was also the ex-member for Sports & Education committee from 2011-2012. She won in BBMP Elections held in 2015 from Krishnarajapuram from Bharatiya Janata Party.  She participated in MLA Elections held in 2018 from Hiriyur Assembly Constituency from BJP and won the election  with a lead of over 12000 votes.

References 

Karnataka MLAs 2018–2023
Living people
Bharatiya Janata Party politicians from Karnataka
People from Chitradurga district
1976 births